The Shenyang–Haikou Expressway, designated as G15 and commonly referred to as the Shenhai Expressway is an expressway in China that connects the cities of Shenyang, Liaoning, and Haikou, Hainan. When fully complete, it will be  in length. One of its oldest portions is the Shenyang–Dalian Expressway, or Shenda Expressway is a  expressway that connects Shenyang and Dalian, the two largest cities of China's Liaoning province.

The expressway is complete for the majority of its length except for two major water crossings that have yet to be built. A fixed link across the Bohai Sea is required to join the first missing link from Dalian to Yantai. The construction of a tunnel was announced in February 2011. Second, a bridge has to be constructed across the Qiongzhou Strait from Mainland China to Hainan. Currently, the southern terminus is Xuwen County, in the city of Zhanjiang, Guangdong, because the fixed link to Haikou, Hainan has not been built yet.

Once fully complete, the expressway features many other important crossings over bodies of water. The expressway crosses the Yangtze River using the Sutong Bridge, the bridge with the second longest cable-stayed span in the world , connecting Nantong and Changshu, a satellite city of Suzhou, in Jiangsu Province. The expressway also uses the Hangzhou Bay Bridge between Jiaxing and Ningbo, one of the longest trans-oceanic bridges in the world.

Route

The expressway passes through the following major cities:

Liaoning
 Shenyang
 Anshan
 Dalian
 Dalian-Yantai Tunnel is being evaluated, but not constructed. Bohai Train Ferry, which carries freight railway cars, trucks, cars and passengers, is currently used.

Shandong
 Qingdao
 Yantai
 Rizhao

Jiangsu
 Lianyungang
 Yancheng
 Nantong
 Suzhou

Shanghai
In Shanghai, the section of the expressway known as Jiajin Expressway enters the city in Jiading District. It passes to the west of the city centre of Jiading, where a multi-level stack interchange connects it with the northern section of the G1501 Shanghai Ring Expressway, before continuing south into Qingpu District. In Qingpu District, it connects with the concurrent G2 Beijing–Shanghai and G42 Shanghai–Chengdu expressways and then passes to the west of Shanghai Hongqiao Airport and Shanghai Hongqiao Railway Station. An interchange with Songze Elevated Road provides access east to the adjacent airport and railway station. At the boundary between Qingpu District and Songjiang District, the expressway intersects with the G50 Shanghai–Chongqing Expressway.

In Songjiang District, the expressway links to the concurrent G60 Shanghai–Kunming and G92 Hangzhou Bay Ring expressways, followed by the S32 Shanghai–Jiaxing–Huzhou Expressway, the latter which connects to Shanghai Pudong International Airport. It then continues into Jinshan District, where it connects again to the G1501 Shanghai Ring Expressway before making a sharp turn west at the S4 Shanghai–Jinshan Expressway just north of the city centre of Jinshan. As it approaches the Zhejiang border, it connects with the southern terminus of S19 Xinnong–Jinshanwei Expressway, a short north-south expressway in Jinshan.

Zhejiang
 Ningbo
 Taizhou
 Wenzhou

Fujian
 Ningde
 Fuzhou
 Putian
 Quanzhou
 Xiamen
 Zhangzhou

Guangdong
 Shantou
 Shenzhen
 Guangzhou
 Yangjiang
 Maoming
 Zhanjiang
 Bridge from Mainland China to Hainan not constructed, no continuation of expressway here

Hainan
 Haikou (when complete)

Detailed Itinerary

Branch expressway 

The Shenyang–Haikou Expressway has a branch expressway, the  G15W Changshu–Taizhou Expressway, between the cities of Changshu, Jiangsu, and Taizhou, Zhejiang. The branch line splits off from the main expressway after the Sutong Bridge and passes through the cities of Suzhou, Jiaxing, and Shaoxing before rejoining the main expressway just north of Taizhou. The spur line is complete.

Shenyang–Dalian Expressway Exits

History 
The Shenyang–Dalian Expressway was built between 1984 and 1990. The name combines the first character of each of the 2 cities, Shen and Da, making it the Shenda highway. It translates literally to Shenda high-speed roadway. Originally, it was a 4-lane freeway. It was rebuilt recently and now has 8 lanes.

Controversy
Shenda highway is claimed to be the first expressway in China mainland. It was planned as an express highway but was actually built as a freeway. Due to its length, it was opened section by section. Although the entire route was not completed until 1990, its first section had already opened in 1986. It was completed in 1988.

References

Chinese national-level expressways
Expressways in Liaoning
Expressways in Jiangsu
Expressways in Shanghai
Expressways in Zhejiang
Expressways in Fujian
Expressways in Guangdong
Expressways in Shandong
Expressways in Hainan